Alexander Akimovich Martynyuk (11 September 1945 – 16 November 2022) was a Russian ice hockey player who played in the Soviet Hockey League.

Career
He played for HC Spartak Moscow with linemates Alexander Yakushev and Vladimir Shadrin. During the 1973 World Ice Hockey Championships Martynyuk scored eight goals against West Germany. He was inducted into the Russian and Soviet Hockey Hall of Fame in 1973.

References

External links
 Russian and Soviet Hockey Hall of Fame bio

1945 births
2022 deaths
Soviet ice hockey players
Ice hockey people from Moscow
HC Spartak Moscow players
Krylya Sovetov Moscow players
EC Kapfenberg players
Honoured Masters of Sport of the USSR